In formal language theory, a leftist grammar is a formal grammar on which certain restrictions are made on the left and right sides of the grammar's productions. This type of grammar was motivated by accessibility problems in the field computer security.

Computational properties
The membership problem for leftist grammars is decidable.

See also
 Unrestricted grammar
 String rewriting

References

Formal languages